Giles is a single-member electoral district for the South Australian House of Assembly. Named after explorer Ernest Giles, it is the largest electorate in the state by area, covering  of South Australian outback. Its main population centre is the industrial city of Whyalla on the far south-east border of the seat which represents half of the electorate's voters. The electorate covers significant areas of pastoral leases and Pitjantjatjara Aboriginal land stretching to the Western Australian and Northern Territory borders, taking in the remote towns of Andamooka, Coober Pedy, Ernabella, Fregon, Marla, Mimili, Mintabie, Oodnadatta, and Tarcoola. Giles also has a far north mobile booth.

Giles was created at the 1991 electoral redistribution to replace the abolished electoral district of Whyalla. It covered an area that had traditionally been one of the few country areas where Labor consistently did well.  Support for the party was particularly strong in the city of Whyalla, which had been a Labor bastion for most of the 20th century.  Labor also had longstanding support in remote mining towns and indigenous communities. As a result, the Whyalla electorate had been in Labor hands without interruption since its creation in 1956.

Sitting Labor MP for Whyalla and incumbent government minister Frank Blevins had won a second term in 1989 with a safe 10.9 percent two-party preferred margin. However, upon the creation of Giles, Labor's two-party preferred margin was halved to 5.2 percent. At the 1993 election landslide, Blevins saw his margin cut to 2.4 percent.  Giles was the only rural seat retained by Labor in an election where Labor was reduced to 10 seats in the 47 seat house. The election resulted in permanent swings away from Labor in most of country South Australia.  Giles was the only rural Labor-held electorate until Labor won Light at the 2006 election landslide; since then Light has remained in Labor hands.

At the redistribution prior to the 1997 election, Giles was massively expanded beyond just Whyalla, stretching to the Western Australia and Northern Territory borders, taking in the western half of the abolished electorate of Eyre, with the eastern half going to the Port Augusta-based electoral district of Stuart.  At this election Blevins retired, and his successor, Lyn Breuer, picked up a swing large enough to make Giles a safe Labor seat.

Breuer made the electorate fairly secure for Labor at subsequent elections before retiring from politics at the 2014 election, where Labor candidate Eddie Hughes retained the seat with only a small swing against him. He was re-elected in 2018, an election that saw the Liberals pushed into third place.

Members for Giles

Election results

Notes

References
 ECSA profile for Giles: 2018
 ABC profile for Giles: 2018
 Poll Bludger profile for Giles: 2018

1993 establishments in Australia
Electoral districts of South Australia